Titus I Mar Thoma Metropolitan (Mar Thoma XV) (20 February 1843 – 20 October 1909) was known as Thithoos Mar Thoma Metropolitan (Thithoos is Aramaic and Malayalam) was the second Mar Thoma Metropolitan (1893–1909) after the Malankara Church split as the Orthodox and reformist factions.

The small state of Kerala is on the southwestern coast of India.  In the 1st century, Thomas the Apostle arrived there to preach the gospel to the Jewish community. Some local residents became followers of Jesus of Nazareth; they were known as Nasrani people and their church as the Malankara Church.  They followed a unique Hebrew-Syriac Christian tradition which included several Jewish elements and Indian customs.

After the split in Malankara Syrian Church Thithoos Mar Thoma was the Metropolitan of the Reformed Fraction, which later chose the name Marthoma Syrian Church of Malabar, now popularly known as the Mar Thoma Church. This church remained completely independent.

Early days

Palakunnathu Family 
In the 17th century, a member of the Panamkuzhy family (a branch of the Pakalomattam family), came and settled in Kozhencherry on the banks of river Pampa. Later they moved to Maramon, and lived at Chackkalyil, on the other side of the river. The second son in that family, Mathen moved to a nearby house at Palakunnathu. He had six sons and a daughter. The daughter was married to Mallapally Pavoothikunnel family and the first four sons moved to Themoottil, Neduvelil (Kozhenchery), Periyilel, and Punamadom (Othera). The fifth son was a hermit priest (sanyasi achen). As was the custom, the youngest son Mathew lived at Palakunnathu family house, which still exists. Abraham Malpan, leader of reformation in Malankara church, was the second son of Mathew.  Thomas Mar Athanasius Metropolitan and Titus I Mar Thoma Metropolitan (Mar Thoma Metropolitan I) were the sons of Abraham Malpan.

A number of other Marthoma Church leaders were also born in this family. Mathews Mar Athanasius Metropolitan and Titus II Mar Thoma Metropolitan (Mar Thoma Metropolitan XV) were from this family. Joseph Mar Thoma Metropolitan (Mar Thoma Metropolitan XXI), was head of the Marthoma Church , is also from this family.

Early age 
Dethos (Aramaic. Titus – English) was born on 20 February 1843, the youngest son of Abraham Malpan and Thumpamon Thondamvelil Mariamma.  He was baptized by Mathews Mar Athanasius Metropolitan at the Maramon church.

After primary education at Maramon he joined Kottayam seminary. He joined C.M.S. College, Kottayam and then left for higher studies in Madras.

Ordination
IN 1867, Dethos was ordained as a priest by Mathews Mar Athanasius Metropolitan at Maramon church and was appointed as the assistant vicar of that church. He was a fiery speaker. During that period a prayer meeting organized at the home of a parishioner later became the Maramon Convention.

Consecration

Enthronement
Thomas Mar Athanasius, was called to glory in August 1893 without consecrating a successor. Most of the churches were under the control of Bava faction. Being a member of the Palakunnathu family and the next hierarchical person the name of Dethos Kathanar was proposed. He accepted, under the condition that all the parishes agreed to this suggestion.
Once it was accepted, parish leaders decided to have the consecration at Kottayam Cheriya palli where Thazhathu Punnathra Chandapilla Kathanar was the vicar. On Thursday 18 January 1894, Dethos Kathanar was consecrated by head of the Malabar Independent Syrian Church,  Joseph Mar Athanasius I (Maliyekkal) (1888–1898) and by  Geevarghese Mar Koorilose V (Karumamkuzhy) Suffragan Metropolitan. He was given the episcopal title Thithoos Mar Thoma Metropolitan. (English: Titus Mar Thoma Metropolitan).

Administration

Participation by laity
In early ages, only clergy were included as advisers to the Metropolitan. After that, they were also included in all decision-making committees.

When Titus Mar Thoma took charge of the church, there was only a clergy committee to take the important decisions. Metropolitan wanted democratic principles to be applied in all decision makings. So after consultation with the clergy committee, a Managing Committee (now known as Sabha Council) and a Representative Assembly (now known as Prathinidhi Mandalam) were set up. Both these committees included all the bishops and representatives of clergy and parishes. The first Managing committee included 7 clergy and five laity. The first meeting of these committees was held in 1896.

Other reforms
A constitution for the Church was prepared and approved by the Representative Assembly and by the Managing Committee.

Vaideeka Selection committee for selecting laity for ordination as clergy was instituted.
 
Qurbana Thaksa (Holy communion liturgy) – improvements were made to the liturgy to fall in line with the reformation ideals. (The Syriac word Qurbana is cognate with the Hebrew word Korban)

Educational institutions
Kottayam Marthoma Seminary School (1896), Tiruvalla S.C. Seminary High School (1902), were opened. It paved the way for the opening of a number of primary schools in a number of parishes. This improved the conditions of the villages and towns in Kerala.

Missionary work
Missionary efforts began around Kottayam and then expanded to North Travancore. By 1909 it spread outside Kerala.
Sunday School Samajam began on 1905

Maramon Convention

But Mar Thoma had to face a number of problems. Due to the lack of a firm doctrinal position, many false teachings of other denominations crept into the church.  By 1894, A number of small prayer groups were forming in the churches for spiritual reaffirmation inside the community and this was followed into a big revival. These regular meetings later took place in parishes. Because the number of people attending these meetings was growing it was brought to the attention of the Bishop and was decided to have a common meeting for these communions organized at an accessible central place. The duty of leading and organizing this meeting was given to the Mar Thoma Evangelistic Association and the first convention was held in 1895 at Maramon. This was the beginning of the Maramon Convention.

Parishes
The litigation which began in 1879 and ended in 1889 was only for the Malankara Church properties. But the parish properties belonged to the individual parishes. So each parish had to go again with separate litigation to possess their parish properties.
 
Parishes (church and their properties) that remained with the Marthoma church during the reformation:
Elanthoor Valia palli, Kumbanad Valia Palli, Koorthamala Palli (Kareelamukku, Koipram), Kottarakara palli, Paryaram pazhya palli, Thalavady West.

After civil cases, the following churches and its properties were under Mar Thoma church but lost hold along time:
Manarcaud palli, Puthencavu palli.

Important churches that Mar Thoma won the earlier court cases, but lost in the final verdict: Arthat palli and St. George Orthodox Church, Puthuppally.

Consecration of a successor
Rev. P. J.  Dethos was selected by the Representative Assembly at Mavelikara to be consecrated as a bishop to assist Metropolitan.  Dethos Kathanar was consecrated on 9 December 1898 at Puthenkavu church by Titus Mar Thoma Metropolitan with the assistance of Geevarghese Mar Koorilose V Metropolitan (Karumamkuzhi) of Malabar Independent Syrian Church. He was given the episcopal title Thithoos Dwitheeyan Mar Thoma Metropolitan, Titus II Mar Thoma.

Two Significant Events
Titus I Mar Thoma Metropolitan escaped from great dangers on two occasions.
The first one was in March 1907 S.C. The Seminary school building at Tiruvalla was under construction. Mar Thoma-XV was living in a temporary thatched shed. During the time the house caught on fire at about night. Mar Thoma-XV was able to notice and save himself and his helpers from there.

The second one was in June 1907. It was pouring heavily, Mar Thoma-XV was living in the balcony of Maramon church. Suddenly the whole church except the balcony crashed.

Last days
Metropolitan was suffering from diabetes for a long time. He died on 20 October 1909 and was entombed at Tiruvalla church. The funeral service was conducted by Titus II Mar Thoma in the presence of Vicar General Ipe Thoma Kathanar and a large crowd.

See also
 Syrian Malabar Nasrani
 Saint Thomas Christians
 Christianity in India
 List of Catholicoi of the East and Malankara Metropolitans
 List of Syrian Malabar Nasranis
 Thomas Mar Athanasius
 Titus II Mar Thoma
 Throne of St. Thomas
 List of Malankara Metropolitans

References

Further References 
Juhanon Marthoma Metropolitan, The Most Rev. Dr. (1952). Christianity in India and a Brief History of the Marthoma Syrian Church. Pub: K.M. Cherian.
Cherian Cherian. (1958). Maramon Pakalomattom Chackalyil Kudumba Charitram (Family History of Maramon Pakalomattom Chackalyil).
Zac Varghese Dr. & Mathew A. Kallumpram. (2003). Glimpses of Mar Thoma Church History. London, England. .
Chacko, T. C. (1936) Malankara Marthoma Sabha Charithra Samgraham (Concise History of Marthoma Church), Pub: E.J. Institute, Kompady, Tiruvalla.
Eapen, Prof. Dr. K.V. (2001). Malankara Marthoma Suryani Sabha Charitram (History of Malankara Marthoma Syrian Church). Pub: Kallettu, Muttambalam, Kottayam.
Ittoop Writer, (1906). Malayalathulla Suryani Chistianikauleday Charitram (History of Syrian Christians in the land of  Malayalam).
Mathew, N. M. Malankara Marthoma Sabha Charitram (History of the Marthoma Church), Volume 1 (2006), Volume II (2007), Volume III (2008). Pub. E.J.Institute, Thiruvalla.
Mathew, N. M. (2003). History of Palakunnathu Family. Pub: Palakunnathu Family committee.

External links 
 
 www.koorthamalamarthoma.org

People from Pathanamthitta district
Titus I
Pakalomattam family
1843 births
1909 deaths
Christian clergy from Kerala